Gertrude of Bavaria (Danish and ; 1152/55–1197) was Duchess of Swabia as the spouse of Duke Frederick IV, and Queen of Denmark as the spouse of King Canute VI.

Gertrude was born to Henry the Lion of Bavaria and Saxony and Clementia of Zähringen in either 1152 or 1155. She was married to Frederick IV, Duke of Swabia, in 1166, and became a widow in 1167. In 1171 she was engaged and in February 1177 married to Canute of Denmark in Lund. The couple lived the first years in Skåne. On 12 May 1182, they became king and queen. She did not have any children. During her second marriage, she chose to live in chastity and celibacy with her husband. Arnold of Lübeck remarked of their marriage, that her spouse was: "The most chaste one, living thus his days with his chaste spouse" in eternal chastity.

References
 Alf Henrikson: Dansk historia (Danish history) (1989) (Swedish)
 Sven Rosborn (In Swedish): När hände vad i Nordens historia (What happened when in Nordic history) (1997)
 Dansk biografisk Lexikon / VI. Bind. Gerson - H. Hansen  (in Danish)

Danish royal consorts
1150s births
1197 deaths
Year of birth uncertain
Duchesses of Swabia
House of Welf
12th-century Danish women
12th-century Danish nobility
12th-century German women
12th-century German nobility
Daughters of monarchs
Remarried royal consorts